Rafaëlle Cohen is a French actress, dancer and singer. She is best known for starring in Le Bal des Vampires, the musical directed by Roman Polanski at the Theatre Mogador in Paris in 2014–2015.

Life and career 
Cohen was born in Paris and raised in London. Thanks to her father's work as a civil engineer, she traveled a lot in her childhood and studied singing and dancing in several countries, on top of school. In 2009 she obtained a double degree from École Centrale Paris and Polytechnic University of Milan as an engineer and an architect.

In 2011, she decided to become an actress and musical performer and has never stopped performing since, with appearances in La Belle au bois dormant, que veillent les fées (Sleeping Beauty), Sister Act, Dance of the Vampires.

In 2017, she portrayed the role of one of the Bimbettes in the Disney film Beauty and the Beast.

In 2019, she portrayed the role of Sara in the American and German film Berlin, I Love You. She appeared as a lead character in the segment "Transitions", directed by Josef Rusnak. In 2021, she starred as Anne Boleyn, Queen of England, in the BBC docu-drama series The Boleyns: A Scandalous Family.

Musicals 

 2018 : Wonderful Town (Leonard Bernstein) dir Olivier Bénézech, MD Larry Blank - French Première at the Opera de Toulon : Eileen
2016 : Mozart, l'opéra rock by Dove Attia and Albert Cohen - South Korea : Aloysia
2014-2015: Dance of the Vampires by Jim Steinman and Michael Kunze, dir Roman Polanski - Théâtre Mogador : Sarah
2014: La Légende d'Hélidote by Jérôme Lifszyc - Béliers Parisiens
2014: Kid Manoir 2 by Guillaume Beaujolais, Fred Colas, David Rozen, dir  David Rozen - Palais des Glaces
2012-2013: Sister Act by Glenn Slater and Alan Menken, dir Carline Brouwer - Théâtre Mogador 
2012: Kid Manoir by Guillaume Beaujolais, Aurélien Berda, Ida Gordon, Fred Colas, dir David Rozen - Avignon
2012-2013: La Belle au Bois Dormant que veillent les fées...  by  Marine André , dir by Florian Cléret - Marsoulan Paris
2011: La Vie parisienne by Jacques Offenbach, dir Anthony Michineau - Marsoulan Paris
2011: Exodus 47 by Gérard Layani - Centre Rachi Paris
2011: A la Vie à l'amour 2, dir Christophe Borie - Casino de Paris
2007: The Man Who Laughs from Victor Hugo, Student version - by Ludovic-Alexandre Vidal and Julien Salvia  Adyar - Paris

Discography

EP 
2009: Opening
2010: Back to Life

Musicals' albums 
2012: La Belle au bois dormant, que veillent les fées
2014: Sister Act le Musical
2017: Disney’s Beauty and the Beast Live Action

Filmography 
2019: Berlin I love you by Emmanuel Benbihy
2017: Beauty and the Beast by Bill Condon
2014: Salaud, on t'aime by  Claude Lelouch

References

External links 

 Official site

Living people
French women singers
French female dancers
French film actresses
French musical theatre actresses
Year of birth missing (living people)